Christopher Kurt Bahr (born February 3, 1953) is a former professional American football and soccer player. He was a placekicker in the National Football League (NFL) and played midfielder in the North American Soccer League.

High school
Attended Neshaminy High School in Langhorne, Pennsylvania.

College
Bahr attended Penn State, where he was named an All-American three times for soccer and once for football. He led the Nittany Lions in scoring in 1975, including four field goals over 50 yards. He averaged 39 yards in punts. Bahr graduated in 1975 with a Bachelor of Science in Biology and later earned a Juris Doctor at Southwestern University School of Law, attending school part-time while still playing with the Raiders.

Soccer
Bahr was the first round draft pick of the Philadelphia Atoms in the 1975 North American Soccer League draft. As a rookie midfielder, he made an immediate impression, tying an NASL scoring record for goals by a locally-born American by netting 11, including two 2-goal games and four game winners.  Bahr also netted the first sudden death goal in Atoms history against the New York Cosmos in front of 20,124 at Veterans Stadium. He was named the 1975 NASL Rookie of the Year. Bahr played 22 games for the Atoms, scoring 11 goals before departing for the NFL.

Bahr also joined his Atoms coach, Al Miller, on the 1976 U.S. National Team. He scored both goals for the United States in their 2–0 shutout of Bermuda in the qualifying rounds for the XXI Olympic Games in Montreal, Quebec, Canada.

NFL
After four seasons with the Cincinnati Bengals, Bahr went on to become a stalwart placekicker with the Oakland/Los Angeles Raiders. He is the Raiders' second all-time leader in scoring (817 points), and his 162 career field goals was a Raiders record until 2007 when it was surpassed by Sebastian Janikowski. Bahr kicked in two Raiders Super Bowl victories, (1981 and 1984). Perhaps his best year as a pro came in 1983 when he compiled a 78% field goal percentage. He finished his career with a strong season, kicking 17 field goals and 29 PATs for the San Diego Chargers in 1989.

He was named to the All-Rookie team in 1976 and a Sporting News All-AFC in 1977.

Career regular season statistics
Career high/best bolded

Personal
Bahr is the son of Walter Bahr, a member of the National Soccer Hall of Fame. His mother, Davies Ann, was a champion swimmer at Temple University and a physical education teacher at Penn State.  His brother Casey Bahr was an All American soccer player at Navy, played professionally and was a member of the 1972 U.S. Olympic soccer team.  His younger brother, Matt Bahr played professional soccer and was also a standout placekicker in the NFL. Sister Davies Ann Bahr was an All-American gymnast at Penn State

Bahr holds an annual Chris Bahr Kicking Camp, a 3-day clinic for student in grades 7–12 at Franklin & Marshall College in Lancaster, Pennsylvania.

After his NFL career, Bahr graduated from Southwestern Law School and practiced law in California and Pennsylvania until 1999 when his license was suspended for failing to pay bar fees. He is currently a financial consultant, managing assets for professional athletes for ProVest Management Group in Columbus, Ohio. He lives in Boalsburg, Pennsylvania with his wife Eve, a corporate attorney, and their two children.

Bahr's son, C.J., is the placekicker for Slippery Rock University.

References

External links
 NASL stats

1953 births
Living people
American football placekickers
American soccer players
Association football midfielders
Cincinnati Bengals players
Los Angeles Raiders players
North American Soccer League (1968–1984) players
Oakland Raiders players
Penn State Nittany Lions football players
Penn State Nittany Lions men's soccer players
Philadelphia Atoms players
San Diego Chargers players
Southwestern Law School alumni
Footballers who switched code
People from State College, Pennsylvania
Players of American football from Pennsylvania
Soccer players from Pennsylvania
All-American men's college soccer players
Association football players that played in the NFL